Gentlemans Pistols are a British rock band based in Leeds, England, formed in 2003.

History 
Gentlemans Pistols were formed in 2003 as a three-piece by singer/guitarist James Atkinson (formerly of UK hardcore group Voorhees), bassist Douglas McLaughlan and drummer Simon Mawson, although this line-up played only one gig before the replacement of Simon Mawson by Adam Clarke in 2004. The line-up was further augmented at this time by the addition of guitarist Chris Rogers, and has remained a four-piece ever since.

They recorded a 7" single "Just A Fraction" in 2006 for the Art Goes Pop label, which was followed by a further 7" "The Lady" for Rise Above Records later that same year. This was followed by their self-titled debut album in August 2007, also on Rise Above Records. The disc was distributed in Japan via Leaf Hound Records, containing the bonus track "Comatose".

Shortly before the release of the debut album, drummer Adam Clarke announced his departure from the group. He was replaced by Stuart Dobbins, formerly of Leeds zombiecore group Send More Paramedics. In June 2009 guitarist Chris Rogers announced his departure from the band. He then was replaced by Bill Steer of Carcass and Firebird fame. This line-up recorded their 2011 album, At Her Majesty's Pleasure.

Martyn Roper was announced as the band's new bassist in April 2013, ahead of their performance at the Berlin date of the DesertFest festival.

Personnel

Current members 
 James Atkinson - Vocals, guitar (2003–present)
 Robert Threapleton - Bass, vocals (2014–present)
 Bill Steer - Guitar (2009–present)
 Stuart Dobbins - Drums (2007–present)

Former members 
 Simon Mawson - Drums (2003–2004)
 Adam Clarke - Drums (2004–2007)
 Chris Rogers - Guitar (2004–2009)
 Douglas McLaughlan - Bass, vocals (2003-2013)
 Martyn Roper - Bass, Vocals (2013-2014)

Timeline

Discography 
 Just a Fraction (7", 2006) - Art Goes Pop Records
 The Lady (7", 2006) - Rise Above Records
 Gentlemans Pistols (LP, 2007) - Rise Above Records
 At Her Majesty’s Pleasure (LP, 2011) - Rise Above Records
 Hustler's Row (LP, 2015) - Nuclear Blast

References

External links 
 
 Rise Above Records website

English rock music groups
Musical groups established in 2003
Musical groups from Leeds